The 2014 China Masters Grand Prix Gold was the sixth grand prix gold and grand prix tournament of the 2014 BWF Grand Prix Gold and Grand Prix. The tournament was held in Olympic Sports Center Xincheng Gymnasium, Changzhou, China April 15–20, 2014 and had a total purse of $120,000.

Players by nation

Representatives by nation

Men's singles

Seeds

  Wang Zhengming (semi-final)
  Tian Houwei (final)
  Wei Nan (semi-final)
  Derek Wong Zi Liang (quarter-final)
  Iskandar Zulkarnain Zainuddin (withdrew)
  Suppanyu Avihingsanon (second round)
  Chan Yan Kit (first round)
  Howard Shu (first round)

Finals

Top half

Section 1

Section 2

Bottom half

Section 3

Section 4

Women's singles

Seeds

  Gu Juan (quarter-final)
  Yao Xue (semi-final)

Finals

Top half

Bottom half

Men's doubles

Seeds

  Kang Jun / Liu Cheng (champion)
  Wannawat Ampunsuwan / Patiphat Chalardchaleam (quarter-final)
  Li Junhui / Liu Yuchen (quarter-final)
  Christopher Rusdianto / Trikusuma Wardhana (second round)

Finals

Top half

Section 1

Section 2

Bottom half

Section 3

Section 4

Women's doubles

Seeds

  Luo Ying / Luo Yu (champion)
  Shinta Mulia Sari / Yao Lei (semi-final)

Finals

Top half

Bottom half

Mixed doubles

Seeds

  Danny Bawa Chrisnanta / Vanessa Neo Yu Yan (second round)
  Liao Min-chun / Chen Hsiao-huan (second round)
  Lu Kai / Huang Yaqiong (champion)
  Praveen Jordan / Debby Susanto (quarter-final)

Finals

Top half

Section 1

Section 2

Bottom half

Section 3

Section 4

References

China Masters
China Masters Grand Prix Gold
China Masters Grand Prix Gold
Sport in Jiangsu
BWF Grand Prix Gold and Grand Prix